Neocollyris attenuata is a species of ground beetle in the genus Neocollyris in the family Carabidae. It was described by Redtenbacher in 1848.

References

Attenuata, Neocollyris
Beetles described in 1848